These 375 species belong to Elaphropus, a genus of ground beetles in the family Carabidae.

Elaphropus species

Subgenus Ammotachys Boyd & Erwin, 2016
 Elaphropus marchantarius Boyd & Erwin, 2016
Subgenus Barytachys Chaudoir, 1868
 Elaphropus anceps (LeConte, 1848)
 Elaphropus anthrax (LeConte, 1852)
 Elaphropus brevis (Casey, 1918)
 Elaphropus brunnicollis (Motschulsky, 1862)
 Elaphropus capax (LeConte, 1863)
 Elaphropus cockerelli (Fall, 1907)
 Elaphropus congener (Casey, 1918)
 Elaphropus conjugens (Notman, 1919)
 Elaphropus cruciatus (Chaudoir, 1868)
 Elaphropus dolosus (LeConte, 1848)
 Elaphropus fatuus (Casey, 1918)
 Elaphropus ferrugineus (Dejean, 1831)
 Elaphropus fuscicornis (Chaudoir, 1868)
 Elaphropus granarius (Dejean, 1831)
 Elaphropus incurvus (Say, 1830)
 Elaphropus liebecki (Hayward, 1900)
 Elaphropus mellitus (Casey, 1918)
 Elaphropus microspilus (Bates, 1882)
 Elaphropus monticola (Casey, 1918)
 Elaphropus mundulus (Bates, 1882)
 Elaphropus nebulosus (Chaudoir, 1868)
 Elaphropus obesulus (LeConte, 1852)
 Elaphropus obtusellus (Bates, 1882)
 Elaphropus pericallis (Bates, 1882)
 Elaphropus purgatus (Bates, 1882)
 Elaphropus rapax (LeConte, 1852)
 Elaphropus renoicus (Casey, 1918)
 Elaphropus rubricauda (Casey, 1918)
 Elaphropus saturatus (Casey, 1918)
 Elaphropus sectator (Casey, 1918)
 Elaphropus sedulus (Casey, 1918)
 Elaphropus tahoensis (Casey, 1918)
 Elaphropus tripunctatus (Say, 1830)
 Elaphropus tritax (Darlington, 1936)
 Elaphropus unistriatus (Bilimek, 1867)
 Elaphropus vernicatus (Casey, 1918)
 Elaphropus vivax (LeConte, 1848)
 Elaphropus xanthopus (Dejean, 1831)
Subgenus Elaphropus Motschulsky, 1839
 Elaphropus aethiopicus Chaudoir, 1876
 Elaphropus afer (Alluaud, 1933)
 Elaphropus ambiguus (Andrewes, 1925)
 Elaphropus amplians (Bates, 1886)
 Elaphropus asthenes (Andrewes, 1925)
 Elaphropus burgeoni (Alluaud, 1933)
 Elaphropus buxans (Andrewes, 1925)
 Elaphropus caraboides Motschulsky, 1839
 Elaphropus debilis (Péringuey, 1908)
 Elaphropus diversus (Andrewes, 1925)
 Elaphropus ethmoides (Alluaud, 1933)
 Elaphropus eurynotus (Andrewes, 1929)
 Elaphropus fartus (Péringuey, 1896)
 Elaphropus glis (Andrewes, 1925)
 Elaphropus globulus (Dejean, 1831)
 Elaphropus haliploides (Bates, 1892)
 Elaphropus imadatei (Jedlicka, 1966)
 Elaphropus imerinae Basilewsky, 1968
 Elaphropus krueperi (Apfelbeck, 1904)
 Elaphropus latissimus (Motschulsky, 1851)
 Elaphropus madecassus (Alluaud, 1933)
 Elaphropus marggii (Kirschenhofer, 1986)
 Elaphropus meridionalis (Jeannel, 1955)
 Elaphropus nanophyes (Andrewes, 1925)
 Elaphropus natalicus Basilewsky, 1958
 Elaphropus nigritulus (Burgeon, 1935)
 Elaphropus nipponicus (Habu & Baba, 1967)
 Elaphropus numatai (Jedlicka & Chujo, 1966)
 Elaphropus opacus (Andrewes, 1925)
 Elaphropus orphnaeus (Andrewes, 1935)
 Elaphropus ovoideus Jeannel, 1946
 Elaphropus pauliani Bruneau de Miré, 1965
 Elaphropus plumbeus Basilewsky, 1953
 Elaphropus porosus (Andrewes, 1925)
 Elaphropus punctus (Andrewes, 1925)
 Elaphropus saundersi (Andrewes, 1925)
 Elaphropus secutorius (Péringuey, 1908)
 Elaphropus shunichii Saito, 1995
 Elaphropus striatulus (Andrewes, 1925)
 Elaphropus zoster (Andrewes, 1937)
 Elaphropus zouhari (Jedlicka, 1961)
Subgenus Idiotachys Boyd & Erwin, 2016
 Elaphropus acutifrons Boyd & Erwin, 2016
Subgenus Nototachys Alluaud, 1930
 Elaphropus borealis (Andrewes, 1925)
 Elaphropus comptus (Andrewes, 1922)
 Elaphropus occidentalis Boyd & Erwin, 2016
 Elaphropus pluripunctus (Andrewes, 1925)
 Elaphropus pseudocomptus (G.Müller, 1942)
 Elaphropus sebakwensis (Péringuey, 1926)
 Elaphropus senegalensis (Alluaud, 1934)
 Elaphropus sphaeroidalis (Bruneau de Miré, 1952)
Subgenus Physotachys Jeannel, 1946
 Elaphropus pachys (Alluaud, 1936)
Subgenus Sphaerotachys G.Müller, 1926
 Elaphropus burgeoni (Bruneau de Miré, 1963)
 Elaphropus curticollis (Sloane, 1896)
 Elaphropus emellen (Bruneau de Miré, 1990)
 Elaphropus fumicatus (Motschulsky, 1851)
 Elaphropus hoemorroidalis (Ponza, 1805)
 Elaphropus kanalensis (Perroud & Montrouzier, 1864)
Subgenus Tachylopha Motschulsky, 1862
 Elaphropus angolanus (Bruneau de Miré, 1966)
 Elaphropus basilewskyi (Bruneau de Miré, 1966)
 Elaphropus carvalhoi (Bruneau de Miré, 1966)
 Elaphropus chappuisi (Bruneau de Miré, 1963)
 Elaphropus congoanus (Basilewsky, 1948)
 Elaphropus corax (Basilewsky, 1948)
 Elaphropus cordatus (Bruneau de Miré, 1966)
 Elaphropus cordicollis (Bruneau de Miré, 1966)
 Elaphropus denticollis Baehr, 1987
 Elaphropus elegans (Andrewes, 1925)
 Elaphropus eumorphus (Alluaud, 1930)
 Elaphropus expunctus (Bruneau de Miré, 1966)
 Elaphropus feai (Alluaud, 1925)
 Elaphropus formosus (Alluaud, 1939)
 Elaphropus gerardianus (Burgeon, 1935)
 Elaphropus ghesquierei (Burgeon, 1935)
 Elaphropus humeralis (Péringuey, 1896)
 Elaphropus iaspideus (Sloane, 1896)
 Elaphropus jeanneli (Alluaud, 1930)
 Elaphropus laevissimus (Bruneau de Miré, 1963)
 Elaphropus lamottei (Basilewsky, 1954)
 Elaphropus leleupi (Basilewsky in Basilewsky & Straneo, 1950)
 Elaphropus loma (Basilewsky, 1971)
 Elaphropus massarti (Bruneau de Miré, 1966)
 Elaphropus maximus (Bruneau de Miré, 1966)
 Elaphropus mediopunctatus (Bruneau de Miré, 1966)
 Elaphropus monticola (Bruneau de Miré, 1966)
 Elaphropus morphnus (Alluaud, 1930)
 Elaphropus obliteratus (Andrewes, 1925)
 Elaphropus optimus (Péringuey, 1898)
 Elaphropus ovatus (Motschulsky, 1851)
 Elaphropus pauliani (Basilewsky, 1968)
 Elaphropus pseudofeai (Bruneau de Miré, 1966)
 Elaphropus pwetoensis (Burgeon, 1935)
 Elaphropus queinneci (Echaroux, 2014)
 Elaphropus reebi (Echaroux, 2014)
 Elaphropus rubronitens (Bruneau de Miré, 1966)
 Elaphropus seydeli (Bruneau de Miré, 1966)
 Elaphropus spenceri (Sloane, 1896)
 Elaphropus strongylus (Alluaud, 1930)
 Elaphropus tecospilus (Basilewsky, 1948)
 Elaphropus tshuapanus (Bruneau de Miré, 1966)
Subgenus Tachyura Motschulsky, 1862
 Elaphropus abimva (Burgeon, 1935)
 Elaphropus aeneus (Putzeys, 1875)
 Elaphropus aequistriatus Baehr, 2014
 Elaphropus akkadi (Abdel-Dayem, 2009)
 Elaphropus amabilis (Dejean, 1831)
 Elaphropus amplipennis (W.J.MacLeay, 1871)
 Elaphropus andrewesi (Jedlicka, 1932)
 Elaphropus angusticollis (Reitter in F.Hauser, 1894)
 Elaphropus annae (Burgeon, 1935)
 Elaphropus anomalus (Kolenati, 1845)
 Elaphropus apicalis (Boheman, 1848)
 Elaphropus arcuatus (Putzeys, 1875)
 Elaphropus ascendens (Alluaud, 1917)
 Elaphropus auberti (Bruneau de Miré, 1964)
 Elaphropus axillaris (Bruneau de Miré, 1952)
 Elaphropus babaulti (Andrewes, 1924)
 Elaphropus badius (Minowa, 1932)
 Elaphropus banksi (Sloane, 1921)
 Elaphropus barringtoni (Andrewes, 1925)
 Elaphropus bechynei (Basilewsky, 1956)
 Elaphropus belli (Andrewes, 1925)
 Elaphropus bembidiiformis (Jordan, 1894)
 Elaphropus biblis (Britton, 1948)
 Elaphropus bibulus (Coquerel, 1866)
 Elaphropus biby (Alluaud, 1918)
 Elaphropus biplagiatus (Dejean, 1831)
 Elaphropus bipustulatus (W.J.MacLeay, 1871)
 Elaphropus bisbimaculatus (Chevrolat, 1860)
 Elaphropus bisignatus (Boheman, 1848)
 Elaphropus blandus (Andrewes, 1924)
 Elaphropus boninensis (Nakane, 1979)
 Elaphropus borneensis (Andrewes, 1925)
 Elaphropus brittoni Baehr, 1987
 Elaphropus buprestioides (Sloane, 1896)
 Elaphropus capicola (Péringuey, 1896)
 Elaphropus cautus (Péringuey, 1898)
 Elaphropus ceylanicus (Nietner, 1858)
 Elaphropus chalceus (Andrewes, 1925)
 Elaphropus championi (Andrewes, 1925)
 Elaphropus charactus (Andrewes, 1925)
 Elaphropus charis (Andrewes, 1925)
 Elaphropus chimbu (Darlington, 1962)
 Elaphropus chujoi (Jedlicka, 1965)
 Elaphropus collarti (Burgeon, 1935)
 Elaphropus compactus (Andrewes, 1925)
 Elaphropus confusus (Coulon & Felix, 2011)
 Elaphropus conspicuus (Schaum, 1863)
 Elaphropus constrictus (Andrewes, 1925)
 Elaphropus convexicollis (Jeannel, 1946)
 Elaphropus conveximargo (Baehr, 2016)
 Elaphropus convexulus (Darlington, 1963)
 Elaphropus convexus (W.J.MacLeay, 1871)
 Elaphropus crassus (Darlington, 1962)
 Elaphropus curvimanus (Wollaston, 1854)
 Elaphropus decoratus (Andrewes, 1925)
 Elaphropus diabrachys (Kolenati, 1845)
 Elaphropus didymus Baehr, 1987
 Elaphropus divisus (Darlington, 1962)
 Elaphropus donaldi (Alluaud, 1916)
 Elaphropus drimostomoides (Fairmaire, 1869)
 Elaphropus dubius (Minowa, 1932)
 Elaphropus duplicatus Baehr, 2014
 Elaphropus elutus (Andrewes, 1935)
 Elaphropus emeritus (Péringuey, 1898)
 Elaphropus erotyloides (Andrewes, 1925)
 Elaphropus eueides (Bates, 1886)
 Elaphropus euphraticus (Reitter, 1885)
 Elaphropus expansicollis (Bates, 1892)
 Elaphropus fadli (Abdel-Dayem, 2009)
 Elaphropus faustus (Péringuey, 1896)
 Elaphropus ferroa (Kopecky in Löbl & Smetana, 2003)
 Elaphropus ferrugatus (Reitter, 1895)
 Elaphropus finitimus (Walker, 1858)
 Elaphropus flavicornis (Sloane, 1921)
 Elaphropus florus (Andrewes, 1925)
 Elaphropus fluviatilis (Bruneau de Miré, 1964)
 Elaphropus fordi (Darlington, 1962)
 Elaphropus frischi (Coulon & Felix, 2009)
 Elaphropus fukiensis (Jedlicka, 1965)
 Elaphropus fumatus (Darlington, 1962)
 Elaphropus fur (Basilewsky, 1954)
 Elaphropus fuscicauda (Bates, 1873)
 Elaphropus fusculus (Schaum, 1860)
 Elaphropus fusiformis (Andrewes, 1925)
 Elaphropus gerardi (Burgeon, 1935)
 Elaphropus germanus (Chaudoir, 1876)
 Elaphropus gestroi (Andrewes, 1925)
 Elaphropus gongylus (Andrewes, 1925)
 Elaphropus gradatus (Bates, 1873)
 Elaphropus grandicollis (Chaudoir, 1846)
 Elaphropus granum (Alluaud, 1936)
 Elaphropus grimmi Baehr, 2016
 Elaphropus hamoni (Jeannel, 1953)
 Elaphropus helmsi (Sloane, 1898)
 Elaphropus hiermeieri Baehr, 2014
 Elaphropus hirsutus Baehr, 2014
 Elaphropus holomelas Baehr, 2014
 Elaphropus horni (Andrewes, 1935)
 Elaphropus hydraenoides (Alluaud, 1936)
 Elaphropus imitans (Péringuey, 1896)
 Elaphropus imperfectus (Andrewes, 1925)
 Elaphropus inaequalis (Kolenati, 1845)
 Elaphropus incilis (Andrewes, 1929)
 Elaphropus interpunctatus (Putzeys, 1875)
 Elaphropus iranicus (Jedlicka, 1963)
 Elaphropus jakli Baehr, 2014
 Elaphropus javanicus (Andrewes, 1925)
 Elaphropus klapperichi (Jedlicka, 1953)
 Elaphropus klugii (Nietner, 1858)
 Elaphropus kuriharai (Morita, 2008)
 Elaphropus laetificus (Bates, 1873)
 Elaphropus laotinus (Andrewes, 1925)
 Elaphropus latus (Peyron, 1858)
 Elaphropus lembodes (Andrewes, 1936)
 Elaphropus leptothorax Baehr, 1987
 Elaphropus lindemannae (Jedlicka, 1963)
 Elaphropus longior (Burgeon, 1935)
 Elaphropus loriae (Andrewes, 1925)
 Elaphropus lucasii (Jacquelin du Val, 1852)
 Elaphropus lusindoi (Burgeon, 1935)
 Elaphropus luteus (Andrewes, 1925)
 Elaphropus madagascariensis (Fairmaire, 1869)
 Elaphropus majusculus (Chaudoir, 1876)
 Elaphropus malabaricus (Andrewes, 1925)
 Elaphropus marani (Jedlicka, 1932)
 Elaphropus martensi Baehr, 2016
 Elaphropus milneanus (Darlington, 1962)
 Elaphropus moestus (Péringuey, 1926)
 Elaphropus momvu (Burgeon, 1935)
 Elaphropus mutatus (Darlington, 1962)
 Elaphropus nadzab (Darlington, 1962)
 Elaphropus nalandae (Andrewes, 1925)
 Elaphropus nanlingensis (Sun & Tian, 2013)
 Elaphropus nannodes (Andrewes, 1925)
 Elaphropus nepos (Darlington, 1962)
 Elaphropus nervosus (Sloane, 1903)
 Elaphropus nigellus (Andrewes, 1935)
 Elaphropus nigrolimbatus (Péringuey, 1908)
 Elaphropus nilgiricus (Andrewes, 1925)
 Elaphropus nitens (Andrewes, 1925)
 Elaphropus notaphoides (Bates, 1886)
 Elaphropus ocellatus (Bates, 1892)
 Elaphropus ordensis Baehr, 1987
 Elaphropus ovensensis (Blackburn, 1891)
 Elaphropus pakistanus (Jedlicka, 1963)
 Elaphropus pallidicauda (Burgeon, 1935)
 Elaphropus pallidicornis (Andrewes, 1925)
 Elaphropus papuae (Andrewes, 1925)
 Elaphropus par (Darlington, 1962)
 Elaphropus parapictus (Darlington, 1962)
 Elaphropus parasenarius (Darlington, 1971)
 Elaphropus parvulus (Dejean, 1831)
 Elaphropus patruelis (Baehr, 2016)
 Elaphropus peryphinus (Bates, 1886)
 Elaphropus pictus (Andrewes, 1925)
 Elaphropus poecilopterus (Bates, 1873)
 Elaphropus politus (Motschulsky, 1851)
 Elaphropus polyporus (Andrewes, 1925)
 Elaphropus pseudoconvexulus Baehr, 1987
 Elaphropus pseudoornatus Baehr, 2014
 Elaphropus psiloides (Darlington, 1962)
 Elaphropus psilus (Andrewes, 1925)
 Elaphropus pulcher (Andrewes, 1925)
 Elaphropus quadrisignatus (Duftschmid, 1812)
 Elaphropus radjabii (Morvan, 1973)
 Elaphropus ravouxi (Jeannel, 1941)
 Elaphropus reticulatus (Andrewes, 1925)
 Elaphropus reticuloides (Darlington, 1962)
 Elaphropus rubescens (Andrewes, 1925)
 Elaphropus rufinus Baehr, 2016
 Elaphropus rufoniger Baehr, 2014
 Elaphropus sabulosus (Bruneau de Miré, 1990)
 Elaphropus salemus (Andrewes, 1933)
 Elaphropus schawalleri Baehr, 2016
 Elaphropus schuelei Baehr, 2014
 Elaphropus senarius (Darlington, 1962)
 Elaphropus septemstriatus Baehr, 2014
 Elaphropus serrulatus (Jeannel, 1946)
 Elaphropus serrulipennis Baehr, 2016
 Elaphropus sexstriatus (Duftschmid, 1812)
 Elaphropus shahinei (Schatzmayr & Koch, 1934)
 Elaphropus shirazi (Jedlicka, 1968)
 Elaphropus sinaiticus (Schatzmayr, 1936)
 Elaphropus singularis (Andrewes, 1925)
 Elaphropus skalei Baehr, 2014
 Elaphropus solidus (Sloane, 1921)
 Elaphropus spurcus (Andrewes, 1925)
 Elaphropus spurius (Péringuey, 1896)
 Elaphropus stenoderus (Andrewes, 1935)
 Elaphropus stevensi (Andrewes, 1925)
 Elaphropus straneoi (Basilewsky, 1962)
 Elaphropus striatifrons (Andrewes, 1925)
 Elaphropus striolatus (W.J.MacLeay, 1871)
 Elaphropus subfumatus (Darlington, 1962)
 Elaphropus submutatus (Darlington, 1962)
 Elaphropus subopacus Baehr, 1987
 Elaphropus surdus (Basilewsky, 1953)
 Elaphropus suturalis (Motschulsky, 1851)
 Elaphropus tagax (Andrewes, 1925)
 Elaphropus tatei (Darlington, 1971)
 Elaphropus tetradymus (Fairmaire, 1893)
 Elaphropus tetraspilus (Solsky, 1874)
 Elaphropus thlibodes (Andrewes, 1935)
 Elaphropus thoracicus (Kolenati, 1845)
 Elaphropus tor (Darlington, 1971)
 Elaphropus tostus (Andrewes, 1925)
 Elaphropus transversalis (Bruneau de Miré, 1952)
 Elaphropus triloris (Andrewes, 1925)
 Elaphropus trinervis (Darlington, 1962)
 Elaphropus trisulcatus (Emden, 1937)
 Elaphropus tshibindensis (Burgeon, 1935)
 Elaphropus ubangiensis (Basilewsky, 1952)
 Elaphropus unitarius (Bates, 1892)
 Elaphropus vadoni (Jeannel, 1946)
 Elaphropus vafer (Andrewes, 1935)
 Elaphropus vagabundus (Andrewes, 1935)
 Elaphropus vagans (Péringuey, 1896)
 Elaphropus vandenberghei (Basilewsky in Basilewsky & Straneo, 1950)
 Elaphropus vangelei (Basilewsky, 1952)
 Elaphropus variabilis (Chaudoir, 1876)
 Elaphropus victoriensis (Blackburn, 1891)
 Elaphropus vigens (Andrewes, 1925)
 Elaphropus virgatus (Andrewes, 1925)
 Elaphropus vixmaculatus (Andrewes, 1925)
 Elaphropus walkerianus (Sharp, 1913)
 Elaphropus weigeli Baehr, 2014
 Elaphropus yunax (Darlington, 1939)
 Elaphropus zulficari (Schatzmayr & Koch, 1934)
Subgenus Tachyuropsis Shilenkov, 2002
 Elaphropus bodemeyeri (A.Fleischer, 1915)
 Elaphropus bombycinus (Andrewes, 1925)
 Elaphropus castaneus (Andrewes, 1925)
 Elaphropus dulcis (Andrewes, 1925)
 Elaphropus exaratus (Bates, 1873)
 Elaphropus holzschuhi (Baehr, 2015)
 Elaphropus micraulax (Andrewes, 1924)
 Elaphropus rhombophorus (Andrewes, 1925)
Subgenus †Tarsitachys Erwin, 1971
 †Elaphropus bilobus (Erwin, 1971)

References

Elaphropus